Utochka is a rural locality (a selo) and the administrative center of Utyanskoye Rural Settlement, Krasnogvardeysky District, Belgorod Oblast, Russia. The population was 236 as of 2010. There are 4 streets.

Geography 
Utochka is located 34 km northwest of Biryuch (the district's administrative centre) by road. Plyukhino is the nearest rural locality.

References 

Rural localities in Krasnogvardeysky District, Belgorod Oblast